The Asian Football Confederation's Pre-Olympic Tournament was held from 20 May 1995 to 27 March 1996.  Twenty-five teams entered the qualification for the three allocated spots for the 1996 Summer Olympics Football tournament in Atlanta.

The qualification saw Korea Republic, Japan and Saudi Arabia winning their final round groups and qualifying to the Olympics.

Format 
Asian berths for the final is 3.

First round
25 teams were grouped into 8 groups, where each group would consist of home and away round-robin tournament. The winners of each group would qualify to the second round. One group was consist of 4 teams, and the other 7 groups were each consist of 3 teams.
Second round
8 teams were grouped into 2 groups of 4 teams each, where each group would consist of round-robin tournament. The top two of each group would qualify to the third round.
Third round
This stage is a single-elimination tournament in which teams play each other in one-off matches, with extra time and penalty shootouts used to decide the winner if necessary. 2 semi-finals were played, Group A winner VS Group B runner-up and Group B winner VS Group A runner-up. This was followed by the third-place match (contested by the losing semi-finalists), and the final. The top three teams would qualify to the finals.

First round
The first round was played in eight groups held from 20 May 1995 to 29 October 1995. The winner of each group will be promoted to the final round.

Group 1

Group 2

Group 3

Group 4

Group 5

Group 6

Group 7

Group 8

Second round
The second round and the third round of the Olympic Qualifiers (U-23 teams) are being played in Malaysia from 16 to 27 March 1996. 
Three of the four semifinal entrants will qualify for the 1996 Olympics in Atlanta, USA.

Group A

Group B

Third round

Semifinals

Third place play-off

Final

South Korea, Japan and Saudi Arabia qualified to the 1996 Summer Olympics Football tournament in Atlanta.

Football qualification for the 1996 Summer Olympics
1996